Congregation Ahavas Achim Anshi Austria, also known as Congregation B'Nai Israel, is a historic synagogue located at Rochester in Monroe County, New York.  It was built in 1928, and is a two-story, Georgian Revival style brick building with decorative cast stone classical details.  It is five-bays wide with the end bays being square towers and a recessed triangular parapet is between the two towers.  The front façade features a portico with four Ionic order round columns. The building was used as a synagogue until 2004.

It was listed on the National Register of Historic Places in 2015.

See also
Leopold Street Shule

References

External links

Synagogues in Upstate New York
Synagogues on the National Register of Historic Places in New York (state)
Georgian Revival architecture in New York (state)
Georgian Revival synagogues
Synagogues completed in 1928
Religious buildings and structures in Rochester, New York
National Register of Historic Places in Rochester, New York